Glen Gordon Hall (24 May 1938 – 26 June 1987) was a South African cricketer who played in one Test match in 1965.

Career
A "tall leg-spinner, quickish with both googly and top-spinner in his repertoire", Glen Hall had a remarkable start to his first-class career. Playing for South African Universities against Western Province in 1960–61, he took 4 for 24 and 9 for 122. His form in subsequent seasons was less productive, but against the touring MCC in 1964–65 in consecutive matches he took 4 for 113 for South African Universities and 6 for 145 for North-Eastern Transvaal, each time for a team that lost by an innings. He was selected for the Third Test shortly afterwards, but took only 1 for 94.

Playing for North-Eastern Transvaal in the B Section of the Currie Cup in 1965–66 he took 27 wickets at 26.11, including 7 for 137 and 4 for 95 against Orange Free State at Pretoria. His form fell away in following seasons, and he played no first-class cricket after 1967–68.

As a batsman he passed 20 only twice in his career, but each time he made a 50. His highest score was for Eastern Province against Transvaal in 1961–62, when he hit 63, his side's top score in a match it lost by an innings.

Personal life

He graduated in pharmacy from Rhodes University, marrying a former Miss South Africa, and fathering two sons. After their divorce in the 1980s he became a recluse, and  committed suicide in 1987; aged 49.

References

External links

1938 births
1987 suicides
South Africa Test cricketers
South African cricketers
Eastern Province cricketers
South African Universities cricketers
Northerns cricketers
Suicides by firearm in South Africa
Rhodes University alumni